The San Diego de Alcala Parish Cathedral, commonly known as Gumaca Cathedral, is a Baroque-style, Roman Catholic cathedral located at Barangay San Diego Poblacion, in the town center of Gumaca, Quezon province, Calabarzon, Philippines. It is the seat and the mother church of the Roman Catholic Diocese of Gumaca.

History
 Its first establishment was in 1582 by the Franciscans, who are the first missionaries who brought Christianity to Gumaca, on its present site. It was transferred to Silangan in Alabat island in 1638. It was burned by the Dutch forces in 1665, which subsequently resulted to them transferring back to its original site in Gumaca. The church was reconstructed in 1690 and completed in 1747. The edifice and the adjoining convent were beautified in 1846. When a strong earthquake hit Gumaca on August 20, 1937, the uppermost portion of the church belfry toppled down, leaving only three of the five-level belfry intact. During the term of Msgr. Jose Oliveros, the belfry and choirloft were reconstructed and was completed in 1999. Known as one of the biggest and oldest Catholic churches in the province of Quezon, the church is made out of coral stone blocks and bricks.

Though the design of the church is mainly Baroque, archival photos show that the interiors were mainly done in Gothic Revival architecture. Its retablos and arco toral design clearly reflects this style, possible due to its popularity in the early 19th century. The church was renovated, and the retablos, together with the pulpit, were lost.

Gallery

References

External links
 Facebook page 

Roman Catholic churches in Quezon
Baroque architecture in the Philippines
Marked Historical Structures of the Philippines
Spanish Colonial architecture in the Philippines
Roman Catholic cathedrals in the Philippines
16th-century Roman Catholic church buildings in the Philippines
18th-century Roman Catholic church buildings in the Philippines
19th-century Roman Catholic church buildings in the Philippines